Sesquialtera is a genus of moths in the family Geometridae erected by Louis Beethoven Prout in 1916.

Species
Sesquialtera audens Prout, 1931
Sesquialtera lonchota Prout, 1931
Sesquialtera ramecourti Herbulot, 1967
Sesquialtera ridicula Prout, 1916 – Namibia, Ethiopia, Kenya, Somalia, and South Africa

References

Geometridae